Mount Seebeck is a mountain standing directly at the head of Roe Glacier in the Tapley Mountains, Queen Maud Mountains. Mapped by United States Geological Survey (USGS) from surveys and U.S. Navy air photos, 1960–64. Named by Advisory Committee on Antarctic Names (US-ACAN) for Richard L. Seebeck, station engineer at McMurdo Station, winter party, 1962.

Mountains of the Ross Dependency
Gould Coast